Susie McDonald, known to other black people as Miss Sue at the time, was one of the plaintiffs in the bus segregation lawsuit Browder v. Gayle (1956). She was arrested for violating bus segregation law on October 21, 1955. She was a widow at the time, in her seventies, walked with a cane, and was light-skinned enough to be mistaken for white by bus operators, though she enjoyed correcting this misconception. Her husband Tom had done railroad work, and she received his pension.

In the 1950s the McDonald family were the owners of a pavilion near Cleveland Avenue, known to black people as McDonald's Farm, where they could go without fear of racist violence. It may be, as family lore has it, that the McDonalds were able to buy the land in the 19th century because they were thought to be white.

In 2019 a statue of Rosa Parks was unveiled in Montgomery, Alabama, and four granite markers were also unveiled near the statue on the same day to honor four plaintiffs in Browder v. Gayle, including Susie McDonald.

References

African-American activists
Activists for African-American civil rights
Activists from Montgomery, Alabama